The Azerbaijan Cup 2000–01 was the 10th season of the annual cup competition in Azerbaijan with the final taking place on 25 May 2001.  Twenty four teams competed in this year's competition. Kapaz were the defending champions.

First round

|}

Round of 16

|}

Quarterfinals
The first legs were played on December 16, 2000 and the second legs on December 23, 2000.

|}

Semifinals
The first legs were played on May 18, 2001 and the second legs on May 22, 2001.

|}

Final

The match was moved from Baku to Sumqayit 2 hours before kick off following a row between stadium officials and the FA concerning gate receipts.

References

External links
Azerbaijan Cup
Azerbaijan Cup '01 RSSSF

Azerbaijan Cup seasons
Azerbaijan Cup 2000-01
Azerbaijan Cup 2000-01